Ellet may refer to:

Ellet (surname)
Ellet, Ohio, neighborhood in Akron, Ohio, United States
Ellet High School, high school in Akron, Ohio
USS Ellet (DD-398), Benham-class destroyer in the United States Navy

People with the given name
Ellet J. Waggoner (1855–1916), American Seventh-day Adventist